Polyedriopsis is a genus of green algae in the order Sphaeropleales. , it contained a single species, Polyedriopsis spinulosa.

References

External links

Sphaeropleales genera
Sphaeropleales
Monotypic algae genera